Elżbieta Teresa Ratajczak (born 14 August 1946 in Leszno) is a Polish politician. She was elected to the Sejm on 25 September 2005, getting 8342 votes in 36 Kalisz district as a candidate from the League of Polish Families list.

She was also a member of Sejm 2001-2005.

See also
Members of Polish Sejm 2005-2007

External links
Elżbieta Ratajczak - parliamentary page - includes declarations of interest, voting record, and transcripts of speeches.

1946 births
Living people
People from Leszno
Members of the Polish Sejm 2005–2007
Members of the Polish Sejm 2001–2005
Women members of the Sejm of the Republic of Poland
League of Polish Families politicians
21st-century Polish women politicians